Kamar de los Reyes (born November 8, 1967) is a Puerto Rican actor. He is best known for his portrayal of Antonio Vega on the ABC soap opera, One Life to Live, and as Raul Menendez, the primary antagonist of the 2012 video game, Call of Duty: Black Ops II.
He also played Jobe a demon in Sleepy Hollow in season 4. He is currently playing a detective on The Rookie season 3.

Career
De los Reyes starred as a Chicano boxer named Pedro 'Roadman' Quinn, in 1994's acclaimed theatrical production of Blade to the Heat.

De los Reyes appeared alongside Patrick Stewart as a "dashing, if thick-tongued" Ferdinand in a 1995 production of William Shakespeare's The Tempest.  In 1997, de los Reyes was named on People Magazine's "Fabulous 50" list.  In 2001, he starred in a television film, The Way She Moves, starring Annabeth Gish and fellow soap opera star Daniel Cosgrove. He also starred in the controversial film Love and Suicide and in Toni Braxton's video for her song "Spanish Guitar". He has made numerous guest appearances on shows such as Law & Order and CSI: Miami.  In 1995, de los Reyes starred with James Woods, Ed Harris and Sir Anthony Hopkins in Oliver Stone's controversial biopic, Nixon, playing convicted Watergate burglar, Eugenio Martínez.

In 2012, he performed the voice acting and the motion-captured body acting of the main antagonist, Raul Menendez, in the video game titled Call of Duty: Black Ops II.  The game's publisher Activision reports an estimated US$1 billion gross in its first fifteen days of availability, which the company states is superior to the seventeen day cinema record held by 2009's Avatar.

In 2013, he played the role of Los Lordes gang leader, Santana in the two-part season finale of the third season of the CBS police procedural drama Blue Bloods.

Personal life
Born in San Juan, Puerto Rico to Cuban percussionist Walfredo de los Reyes and a Puerto Rican mother, Matilde Pages, Kamar de los Reyes grew up in Las Vegas, Nevada. He is the brother of the percussionist of the band Chicago, Walfredo Reyes Jr., and to former Yanni, and now Zac Brown Band percussionist, Daniel de los Reyes.  He married actress Sherri Saum in 2007 and they have twin boys. He has a son named Caylen, from a previous relationship.

Filmography

References

External links

1967 births
Living people
Male actors from San Juan, Puerto Rico
Puerto Rican male film actors
Puerto Rican male soap opera actors
Puerto Rican male stage actors
Puerto Rican male television actors
20th-century Puerto Rican male actors
21st-century Puerto Rican male actors